Ganeshpur  is a village in Chanditala community development block of Srirampore subdivision in Hooghly district in the Indian state of West Bengal.

Geography

Gram panchayat
Villages in Ainya gram panchayat are: Akuni, Aniya, Bandpur, Banipur, Bara Choughara, Dudhkanra, Ganeshpur, Goplapur, Jiara, Kalyanbati, Mukundapur, Sadpur and Shyamsundarpur.

Demographics
As per 2011 Census of India, Ganeshpur had a total population of 474 of which 233 (49%) were males and 241 (51%) were females. Population below 6 years was 43. The total number of literates in Ganeshpur was 316 (73.32% of the population over 6 years).

Transport
Baruipara railway station is the nearest railway station.

References 

Villages in Chanditala I CD Block